The decathlon is a combined event in athletics consisting of ten track and field events. The word "decathlon" was formed, in analogy to the word "pentathlon", from Greek δέκα (déka, meaning "ten") and ἄθλος (áthlos, or ἄθλον, áthlon, meaning "contest" or “prize”). Events are held over two consecutive days and the winners are determined by the combined performance in all. Performance is judged on a points system in each event, not by the position achieved. The decathlon is contested mainly by male athletes, while female athletes typically compete in the heptathlon.

Traditionally, the title of "World's Greatest Athlete" has been given to the person who wins the decathlon. This began when Gustav V of Sweden told Jim Thorpe, "Sir, you are the world's greatest athlete" after Thorpe won the decathlon at the Stockholm Olympics in 1912.

The event is similar to the pentathlon held at the ancient Greek Olympics, and also similar to a competition called an "all-around", which was contested at the United States amateur championships in 1884. Another all-around was held at the 1904 Summer Olympics. The modern decathlon first appeared at the 1912 Games.

In modern athletics, the ten events are: 100 metres, 400 metres, 1500 metres, 110 metre hurdles, long jump, high jump, pole vault, discus throw, javelin throw and shotput. The current official decathlon world record holder is Frenchman Kevin Mayer, who scored a total of 9,126 points at the 2018 Décastar in France.

Historical background
The decathlon developed from the ancient pentathlon competitions held at the ancient Greek Olympics. Pentathlons involved five disciplines – long jump, discus throw, javelin throw, sprint and a wrestling match. Introduced in Olympia during 708 BC, this competition was extremely popular for many centuries.

A ten-event competition known as the "all-around" or "all-round" championship, similar to the modern decathlon, was first contested at the United States amateur championships in 1884 and reached a consistent form by 1890. While an all-around event was held at the 1904 Summer Olympics,  whether it was an official Olympic event has been disputed.

The modern decathlon first appeared in the Olympic athletics program at the 1912 Games in Stockholm.

Format

Men's decathlon 
The vast majority of international and top-level men's decathlons are divided into a two-day competition, with the track and field events held in the order below. Traditionally, all decathletes who finish the event, rather than just the winner or medal-winning athletes, do a round of honour together after the competition. The current world record holder is Kevin Mayer from France with 9126 points which he set on September 16, 2018, in Talence, France.

 Day 1
 100 metres
 Long jump
 Shot put
 High jump
 400 metres

Day 2
 110 metres hurdles
 Discus throw
 Pole vault
 Javelin throw
 1500 metres

Women's decathlon 
At major championships, the women's equivalent of the decathlon is the seven-event heptathlon; before 1981 it was the five-event pentathlon. However, in 2001, the IAAF (now World Athletics) approved scoring tables for a women's decathlon; the current world record holder is Austra Skujytė of Lithuania, with 8,366. Women's disciplines differ from men's in the same way as for standalone events: the shot, discus, and javelin weigh less, and the sprint hurdles use lower hurdles over 100 m rather than 110 m. The points tables used are the same as for the heptathlon in the shared events. The schedule of events differs from the men's decathlon, with the field events switched between day one and day two; this is to avoid scheduling conflicts when men's and women's decathlon competitions take place simultaneously.

 Day 1
 100 metres
 Discus throw
 Pole vault
 Javelin throw
 400 metres

Day 2
 100 metres hurdles
 Long jump
 Shot put
 High jump
 1500 metres

One hour 
The one-hour decathlon is a special type of decathlon in which the athletes have to start the last of ten events (1500 m) within sixty minutes of the start of the first event. The world record holder is Czech decathlete Robert Změlík, who achieved 7,897 points at a meeting in Ostrava, Czechoslovakia, in 1992.

Masters athletics 
In Masters athletics, performance scores are age graded before being applied to the standard scoring table. This way, marks that would be competitive within an age division can get rated, even if those marks would not appear on the scale designed for younger age groups. Additionally, like women, the age divisions use different implement weights and lower hurdles. Based on this system, German Rolf Geese in the M60 division and American Robert Hewitt in the M80 divisions have set their respective world records over 8,000 points. Using the same scale, Nadine O'Connor scored 10,234 points in the W65 division, the highest decathlon score ever recorded.

Points system 

The 2001 IAAF points tables use the following formulae:
 Points =  for track events (faster time produces a higher score)
 Points =  for field events (greater distance or height produces a higher score)

A, B and C are parameters that vary by discipline, as shown in the table on the right, while P is the performance by the athlete, measured in seconds (running), metres (throwing), or centimetres (jumping).

The decathlon tables should not be confused with the scoring tables compiled by Bojidar Spiriev, to allow comparison of the relative quality of performances by athletes in different events. On those tables, for example, a decathlon score of 9,006 points equates to 1,265 "comparison points", the same number as a triple jump of 18 m.

Benchmarks 

Split evenly between the events, the following table shows the benchmark levels needed to earn 1,000, 900, 800, and 700 points in each sport.

Records 

The official decathlon world record holder is Kevin Mayer of France, with a score of 9,126 points set during the 2018 Décastar in Talence, France, which was ratified by World Athletics.

The previous record from Ashton Eaton (9,045 points):

Decathlon bests 
The total decathlon score for all world records in the respective events would be 12,598. The total decathlon score for all the best performances achieved during decathlons is 10,590. The Difference column shows the difference in points between the decathlon points that the individual current world record would be awarded and the points awarded to the current decathlon record for that event. The % Difference column shows the percentage difference between the time, distance or height of the individual world record and the decathlon record (other than the Total entry, which shows the percentage difference between awarded decathlon points). The relative differences in points are much higher in throwing events than in running and jumping events.

Decathlon bests are only recognized when an athlete completes the ten-event competition with a score of over 7,000 points.

All-time top 25

Men 
Correct as of July 2022.

Notes
Below is a list of other scores equal or superior to 8768 pts:
Ashton Eaton also scored 9039 (2012), 8893 (2016) and 8809 (2013).
Damian Warner also scored 8995 (2021), 8797 (2022) and 8795 (2018).
Tomáš Dvořák also scored 8902 (2001), 8900 (2000) and 8837 (1997).
Roman Šebrle also scored 8893 (2004), 8807 (2003) and 8800 (2002).
Kevin Mayer also scored 8834 (2016), 8816 (2022) and 8768 (2017).
Dan O'Brien also scored 8824 (1996) and 8812 (1991).
Bryan Clay also scored 8791 (2008).

Women
Correct as of September 2021.

Notes
Below is a list of other scores equal or superior to 8000 pts:
Austra Skujytė also scored 8091 pts (2006).

Competitions

Olympic medalists

World Championships medalists

Continental competitions 

 African Combined Events Championships
 European Cup Combined Events
 Oceania Combined Events Championships
 Pan American Combined Events Cup

Other 

 IAAF Combined Events Challenge
 Multistars
 Hypo-Meeting
 TNT - Fortuna Meeting
 Erdgas Mehrkampf-Meeting
 Décastar

Season's bests

National records 
Updated 23 November 2022.
NR's equal or superior to 8,000 pts:

Junior (under-20) Decathlon bests

Other multiple event contests 
 Aquathlon
 Biathlon
 Chess-boxing
 CrossFit Games
 Duathlon
 Heptathlon
 Icosathlon or double decathlon
 Modern pentathlon
 Nordic combined
 Octathlon
 Omnium
 Quadrathlon
 Triathlon

See also

Explanatory notes

References

External links 

 IAAF decathlon homepage
 IAAF list of decathlon records in XML
 Team Decathlon website
 Decathlon splits of Olympic, World and European medalists
 A downloadable Excel spreadsheet of multi-event scoring and age grading is available from the creator, Stefan Waltermann

 
Combined track and field events
Endurance games
Events in track and field
Individual sports
Men's athletics
Summer Olympic disciplines in athletics